Bathytropidae is a family of crustaceans belonging to the order Isopoda.

Genera:
 Australoniscus Vandel, 1973
 Bathytropa Budde-Lund, 1885
 Cubanoscia Vandel, 1981
 Dumetoniscus Taiti & Checcucci, 2009
 Laninoniscus Reca, 1973
 Monitus Lewis, 1998
 Myrmekiocellio Verhoeff, 1936
 Neotroponiscus Arcangeli, 1936
 Rhabdoniscus Vandel, 1981

References

Isopoda